Van Wyk and Grumbach syndrome is a medical condition defined by a combination of hypothyroidism, precocious puberty (usually with delayed bone age) and ovarian cysts in pre- and post-pubertal girls.

Presentation
Symptoms are ascites, pleural and pericardial effusions, elevated ovarian tumour markers, enlarged pituitary gland and elevated prolactin and alpha-fetoprotein levels.

Mechanism 
The presumed pathogenesis is that primary hypothyroidism causes enlargement and hyperstimulation of the pituitary gland which in turn cause ovarian hyperstimulation, ovarian cysts and precocious puberty.

Diagnosis 
Diagnosis is made by imaging/sonography and thyroid hormone tests.

Treatment 
The syndrome usually responds well to thyroid hormone replacement with complete resolution of symptoms.

History 
The syndrome was described in 1960 by Van Wyk and Melvin M. Grumbach.

References

Thyroid disease
Noninflammatory disorders of female genital tract
Syndromes